The Grammy Award for Best Americana Album is an honor presented to recording artists for quality albums in the Americana music genre at the Grammy Awards, a ceremony that was established in 1958 and originally called the Gramophone Awards. Honors in several categories are presented at the ceremony annually by the National Academy of Recording Arts and Sciences of the United States to "honor artistic achievement, technical proficiency and overall excellence in the recording industry, without regard to album sales or chart position".

In 2009, the Academy announced that the award for Best Contemporary Folk/Americana Album would be split into two separate categories: Best Contemporary Folk Album and Best Americana Album. The distinction between the two award categories is based on the use of acoustic versus electric instruments; acoustic instruments predominate in "contemporary folk" and electric instruments are characteristic of Americana. Jed Hilly, executive director of the Americana Music Association, called the new category's inclusion "a huge acknowledgment" of the music genre. Hilly admitted to working hard at convincing the Academy to include Americana as its own category. The music industry had been using the term "Americana music" for about 15 years before the new award was created.  Following is the award's purpose, according to the category description guide from the 2018 Grammy Awards:

The award was first presented in 2010 to Levon Helm at the 52nd Grammy Awards for the album Electric Dirt. Emmylou Harris, Lucinda Williams, Brandi Carlile and Keb' Mo' have been nominated the most times (three).

Recipients

Artists with multiple wins
2 wins
 Brandi Carlile
 Levon Helm
 Jason Isbell

Artists with multiple nominations

3 nominations
 Brandi Carlile
 Emmylou Harris
 Keb' Mo'
 Lucinda Williams

2 nominations
 The Avett Brothers
 Rosanne Cash
 Rodney Crowell
 Levon Helm
 Iron & Wine
 Jason Isbell
 The Mavericks
 Willie Nelson
 Robert Plant
 Bonnie Raitt
 Mavis Staples
 Yola

See also
 Americana Music Association
 Heartland rock
 List of Grammy Award categories
 Roots rock

References

General
  Note: User must select the "American Roots" category as the genre under the search feature.

Specific

Album awards
Americana music
Awards established in 2010
Americana Album
Grammy Award for Best Americana Album